Nakornping Hospital is a hospital located in Chiang Mai, Thailand. It is the second largest hospital in Chiang Mai with an in-patient capacity of 742 beds as of 2022.  It is now serving as the regional hospital of Chiang Mai province. It is a CPIRD Medical Education Center for the School of Medicine, University of Phayao.

See also 
 Hospitals in Thailand
 List of Hospitals in Thailand

References

Hospitals in Thailand
Buildings and structures in Chiang Mai province